Pontella is a marine copepod genus in the family Pontellidae. It is an organism that bears three lenses in the eye. The outer has a parabolic surface, countering the effects of spherical aberration while allowing a sharp image to be formed.

Pontella includes the following species:

Pontella agassizii Giesbrecht, 1895
Pontella alata A. Scott, 1909
Pontella andersoni Sewell, 1912
Pontella argentea Dana, 1849
Pontella asymmetrica Heinrich, 1967
Pontella atlantica (Milne-Edwards, 1840)
Pontella bairdii Lubbock, 1853
Pontella barbata Tanaka, 1936
Pontella bifurcata Tanaka, 1936
Pontella bonei Mulyadi, 2003
Pontella brachiata Dana, 1849
Pontella brachyura (Kroyer, 1849)
Pontella brevicornis (Lubbock, 1857)
Pontella cerami A. Scott, 1909
Pontella chierchiae Giesbrecht, 1889
Pontella contracta Dana, 1849
Pontella cristata Kramer, 1896
Pontella curta Dana, 1849
Pontella curticornis Dana, 1852
Pontella danae Giesbrecht, 1889
Pontella darwinii (Lubbock, 1853)
Pontella denticauda A. Scott, 1909
Pontella detonsa Dana, 1849
Pontella diagonalis C. B. Wilson, 1950
Pontella edwardsii (Kroyer, 1849)
Pontella elegans (Claus, 1892)
Pontella elephas Brady, 1883
Pontella emerita Dana, 1849
Pontella eugeniae Leuckart, 1859
Pontella fera Dana, 1849
Pontella forcipata Tanaka, 1936
Pontella forficula A. Scott, 1909
Pontella gaboonensis T. Scott, 1894
Pontella gracilis C. B. Wilson, 1950
Pontella hanloni Greenwood, 1979
Pontella helgolandica Claus, 1863
Pontella indica Chiba, 1956
Pontella inermis Brady, 1883
Pontella investigatoris Sewell, 1912
Pontella karachiensis Rehman, 1973
Pontella kieferi Pesta, 1933
Pontella kleini Mulyadi, 2003
Pontella labuanensis Mulyadi, 1997
Pontella latifurca Chen & Zhang, 1965
Pontella lobiancoi (Canu, 1888)
Pontella longipedata Sato, 1913
Pontella marplatensis Ramirez, 1966
Pontella meadii Wheeler, 1900
Pontella mediterranea (Claus, 1863)
Pontella mimocerami Fleminger, 1957
Pontella natalis Brady, 1915
Pontella novaezealandiae Farran, 1929
Pontella patagoniensis (Lubbock, 1853)
Pontella pattersonii (Templeton, 1837)
Pontella pennata C. B. Wilson, 1932
Pontella perspicax Dana, 1849
Pontella plumata Dana, 1849
Pontella polydactyla Fleminger, 1957
Pontella princeps Dana, 1849
Pontella protensa Dana, 1849
Pontella pulvinata C. B. Wilson, 1950
Pontella raynaudii (Milne-Edwards, 1840)
Pontella regalis Dana, 1849
Pontella resnautica Oliveira, 1946
Pontella rostraticauda Ohtsuka, Fleminger & Onbé, 1987
Pontella rubescens Dana, 1849
Pontella savignyi (Milne-Edwards, 1828)
Pontella securifer Brady, 1883
Pontella setosa Lubbock, 1856
Pontella sewelli Heinrich, 1987
Pontella sinica Chen & Zhang, 1965
Pontella speciosa Dana, 1849
Pontella spinicauda Mori, 1937
Pontella spinipedata Heinrich, 1989
Pontella spinipes Giesbrecht, 1889
Pontella strenua Dana, 1849
Pontella suchumica Kritchagin, 1873
Pontella surrecta C. B. Wilson, 1950
Pontella tenuiremis Giesbrecht, 1889
Pontella tridactyla Shen & Lee, 1963
Pontella turgida Dana, 1849
Pontella valida Dana, 1852
Pontella vervoorti Mulyadi, 2003
Pontella whiteleggei Kramer, 1896

References

Calanoida